The Bank of Greece (ΤτΕ) is the central bank of Greece. Its headquarters is located in Athens on Panepistimiou Street, but it also has several branches across the country. It was founded in 1927 and its operations started officially in 1928. The building that currently houses its headquarters was completed ten years later in 1938. Until January 2001 (when Greece adopted the euro) the bank was responsible for the former national Greek currency, the drachma. (Greece had failed to meet the membership criteria and was excluded from participating when the euro was launched on 1 January 1999.) Use of physical drachma notes and coins continued until 31 December 2001, as denominations of the euro.)

The Bank of Greece is listed on the Athens Exchange.

Introduction

The Bank of Greece, a member of the European System of Central Banks (ESCB), is the national central bank of Greece and was established by Law 3424/7 December 1927. The shares of the Bank of Greece are registered and have been listed on the Athens Exchange since June 12, 1930.

It is a partially state owned S.A. share company with special privileges, special restrictions, and duties. It cannot operate as a commercial bank and the percentage of shares that can be under Greek state ownership cannot exceed 35% (initially this limit was 10%). It has a staff of more than 1,800 employees.

The primary objective of the Bank of Greece is to ensure price stability in Greece. It also supervises the private banks and acts as a treasurer and fiscal agent for the Greek government. Since law 3867/2010 was passed the Bank of Greece is also responsible for supervising private insurance companies, merging with the Committee for the Supervision of Insurance Companies established by law 3229/2004.

Its Euro banknotes printer identification code is Y.

The Bank of Greece also sells gold sovereigns.

Governor

The chief officer of the Bank of Greece is the Governor, a governmental appointee.

List of governors of the Bank of Greece

a During the Axis occupation of Greece (1941–44), Governor Kyriakos Varvaresos followed the Greek government in exile to London. The collaborationist governments in Greece fired Varvaresos in 1941 and appointed first Miltiadis Negrepontis as Governing Counsellor (April 24, 1941 – July 3, 1941) and then Dimitrios Santis (July 3, 1941 – January 20, 1943) and finally Theodoros Tourkovasilis (April 19, 1943 – April 13, 1944) as Governors. After the liberation all dismissals and appointments by occupation-era governments concerning members of the administration of the Bank of Greece were declared null and void.

Deputy governors
The deputy governor is the Bank's second-in-line officer. Traditionally the Deputy Governors' main remit is administration, whereas Governors supervise monetary policy at large.

Emmanouil Tsouderos: April 21, 1928 – October 31, 1931
Emmanouil Kamaras: November 25, 1931 – May 30, 1932
Kyriakos Varvaresos: March 1, 1933 – August 4, 1939
Georgios Mantzavinos (*): September 28, 1936 – February 11, 1946
Ioannis Arvanitis: August 4, 1939 – April 26, 1941
Stylianos Gregoriou: March 28, 1945 – February 2, 1955
Vasileios Kyriakopoulos: February 5, 1955 – December 24, 1955
Dimitrios Galanis: December 31, 1955 – August 7, 1967
Ioannis Pesmazoglou: February 11, 1960 – August 5, 1967
Konstantinos Thanos: January 5, 1968 – September 10, 1969
Efstathios Panas: September 11, 1969 – August 9, 1974
Nikolaos Kyriazidis: August 9, 1974 – January 5, 1977
Nikolaos Charisopoulos: October 21, 1975 – November 6, 1981
Evangelos Devletoglou: December 23, 1977 – November 8, 1978
Georgios Drakos: November 24, 1978 – October 20, 1981
Dimitrios Chalikias: November 16, 1981 – February 6, 1984
Evangelos Kourakos (1st period): July 10, 1982 – February 11, 1986
Panagiotis Korliras: February 20, 1984 – August 30, 1985
Efstathios Papageorgiou: September 17, 1985 – September 17, 1989
George Provopoulos: October 1, 1990 – November 29, 1993
Vasileios Antonioudakis: October 1, 1990 – December 19, 1991
Panagiotis Pavlopoulos: February 21, 1992 – November 29, 1993
Evangelos Kourakos (2nd period): December 1, 1993 – September 4, 1996
Lucas Papademos: December 1, 1993 – October 26, 1994
Panagiotis Thomopoulos: October 26, 1994 – February 26, 2009
Nikolaos Garganas: September 5, 1996 – June 13, 2002
Nikolaos Palaiokrassas: June 14, 2002 – June 14, 2008
Eleni Dendrinou Louri: June 20, 2008 – June 20, 2014
Iannis Mourmouras: September, 2014 - 
Theodoros Mitrakos: March 2015 -

(*): During the Axis occupation of Greece (1941–44), Deputy Governor Georgios Mantzavinos followed the Greek government in exile to London. The collaborationist governments in Greece fired Mantzavinos in 1941 and appointed Andreas Papadimitriou (July 3, 1941 – November 18, 1941) and Spyridon Hatzikyriakos (April 5, 1943 – October 5, 1944) as Deputy Governors. After the liberation all dismissals and appointments by occupation-era governments concerning members of the administration of the Bank of Greece were declared null and void.

See also

Banking in Greece
List of banks in Greece

General:
Economy of Greece
European System of Central Banks

References

 Hellenic Parliament June 2015 Page 22

External links
 Bank of Greece official site
 Governor report on the balance sheet of 31st December 1928

 
Banks established in 1927
Companies listed on the Athens Exchange
Greece
Government-owned companies of Greece
Greek companies established in 1927